Kalininsk may refer to:
Kalininsk, Kyrgyzstan, a village in Kyrgyzstan
Kalininsk Urban Settlement, a municipal formation which the town of Kalininsk in Kalininsky District of Saratov Oblast, Russia is incorporated as
Kalininsk, Russia, several inhabited localities in Russia